Raymond A. Radziszewski (born March 1, 1935) is an American former professional basketball player who played in the National Basketball Association (NBA). He played college basketball for the Saint Joseph's Hawks.

Radziszewski attended James J. Ferris High School in Jersey City, New Jersey. He graduated at age 16 without any athletic scholarships. Working at a brokerage in New York City, he was playing on the company team when he was noticed by an alumnus of Saint Joseph's University, who arranged a tryout with coach Bill Ferguson of the school's basketball team. Already with a scholarship offer from Saint Michael's College in hand, Radziszewski then received one from Saint Joseph's, which he accepted. He averaged 14.3 points and 15.5 reboiunds as a senior with the Hawks.

Radziszewski was selected by the Philadelphia Warriors in the fourth round of the  1957 NBA draft with the 30th overall pick. He appeared in one NBA game in his career, recording two rebounds and one assist, before he was released. Afterwards, he signed with the Wilmington Jets of the Eastern Professional Basketball League. He later joined the Army, where he played basketball on service teams.

References

External links

Statistics at statscrew.com

1935 births
Living people
American men's basketball players
Basketball players from Jersey City, New Jersey
Forwards (basketball)
James J. Ferris High School alumni
Philadelphia Warriors draft picks
Philadelphia Warriors players
Saint Joseph's Hawks men's basketball players